Kristi Joti (born 15 January 1998) is an Albanian footballer who currently plays for KF Korabi Peshkopi in the Kategoria e Parë.

Club career

Kukësi
In August 2017, Joti moved to Albanian Superliga club FK Kukësi. He made his league debut for the club on 2 December 2017 in a 2-1 away loss to KF Skënderbeu Korçë. He was subbed on for Eni Imami in the 85th minute.

Tomori Berat
In August 2018, Joti was loaned out to Albanian First Division club FK Tomori Berat. He made his competitive debut for the club on 9 September 2018 in a 1-1 home draw with Lushnja, playing 89 minutes before being replaced by Ardian Gega.

Honours
Kukësi
Albanian Superliga Runner-Up: 2017–18
Albanian Supercup Runner-Up: 2017–18

References

External links
Profile at Football Database

1998 births
Living people
Footballers from Tirana
Albanian footballers
Association football midfielders
KF Tirana players
FK Kukësi players
FK Tomori Berat players
KF Korabi Peshkopi players
Kategoria Superiore players
Kategoria e Parë players